The Tribune Building in Casper, Wyoming, on East 2nd Street, was built in 1920 to house the Casper Tribune newspaper.  It was listed on the National Register of Historic Places in 1994.

It is a three-story brick building designed by architects Garbutt, Weidner and Sweeney.

References

Newspaper buildings
National Register of Historic Places in Natrona County, Wyoming
Buildings and structures completed in 1920